Badge of Silver (foaled March 25, 2000) is an American Thoroughbred racehorse, winner of the 2006 San Gabriel Handicap.

Career

Badge of Silver on his first race on April 12, 2002 at Keeneland.

He continued winning, by taking the 2003 Risen Star Stakes.

On January 8, 2005, he captured the Hal's Hope Stakes and then followed it with a win at the 2005 New Orleans Handicap.

His last major win came on January 1, 2006 at the San Gabriel Handicap.

His final race was at the 2006 Cigar Mile Handicap, where he placed in second.

Stud career
Badge of Silver's descendants include:

c = colt, f = filly

Pedigree

References

2000 racehorse births
Racehorses bred in Kentucky
Racehorses trained in the United States
Thoroughbred family 5-j